Luca Valzania (born 5 March 1996) is an Italian professional footballer who plays as a central midfielder for  club SPAL, on loan from Cremonese.

Club career

Cesena 
Valzania started his career at Cesena. On 13 May 2014 he made his professional debut for Cesena in Serie B as a substitute replacing Moro Alhassan in the 76th minute of a 1–0 home win over Empoli. At the end of 2013–14 season Cesena won the Serie B play-off and it was promoted in Serie A. On 6 January 2015, Valzania made his Serie A debut in a 4–1 home defeat against Napoli, he was replaced by Massimo Volta in the 79th minute.

Atalanta 
On 30 June 2015, Valzania was sold to Atalanta B.C. for €6 million. That transfer window Cesena also signed Moussa Koné and Federico Varano from Atalanta, for a total transfer fee of €6 million.

Loan to Cesena 
On 2 July 2015, Valzania was loaned back to Cesena on a season-long loan deal. On 9 August, Valzania made his debut for Cesena in a 4–0 home win over Lecce in the second round of Coppa Italia, he played the entire match. On 5 September he made his Serie B debut for Cesena in a 2–0 home win over Brescia, he was replaced by Luca Garritano in the 63rd minute. On 19 September he played his first entire match for Cesena, a 3–1 away win over Ascoli. On 1 December he played in the fourth round of Coppa Italia, a 4–1 away defeat against Torino. Valzania ended his loan to Cesena with 19 appearances and 1 assist.

Loan to Cittadella 
On 15 July 2016, Valzania was loaned to Serie B club Cittadella on a season-long loan deal. On 7 August he made his debut for Cittadella as a substitute replacing Lucas Chiaretti in the 79th minute of a 2–1 home defeat, after extra-time, against Cremonese in the second round of Coppa Italia. On 27 August, Valzania made his Serie B debut for Cittadella in a 2–1 away win over Bari, he was replaced by Andrea Schenetti in the 77th minute. On 1 January 2017, Valzania played his first entire match for Cittadella, a 2–0 away win over Trapani. On 22 April he scored his first professional goal in the 66th minute of a 4–1 home win over Carpi. Valzania ended his season-long loan to Cittadella with 35 appearances, 1 goal and 5 assists.

Loan to Pescara 
On 15 July 2017, Valzania left for Pescara on a season-long loan deal, with an option to buy at the end of season. On 12 August he made his debut for Pescara as a substitute replacing Christian Capone in the 59th minute of a 3–1 away win over Brescia in the third round of Coppa Italia. On 3 September, Valzania made his Serie B debut for Pescara as a substitute replacing Mamadou Coulibaly in the 65th minute of a 4–2 away defeat against Perugia. On 19 September he played his first entire match for Pescara, a 2–2 home draw against Virtus Entella. On 2 December, Valzania scored twice in a 3–3 home draw against Ternana. On 8 December he was sent off with a red card in the 90th minute of a 4–2 away defeat against Cesena. On 28 December, Valzania scored his third goal in the 86th minute of a 1–0 home win over Venezia. Valzania ended his loan to Pescara with 34 appearances, 5 goals and 4 assists.

Loan to Frosinone
On 8 January 2019, Valzania joined on loan to Frosinone until 30 June 2019. On 4 February he made his debut for the club in Serie A in a 1–0 home defeat against Lazio, he was replaced by Marcello Trotta after 81 minutes. On 17 March, Valzania scored his first goal for Frosinone, as a substitute, in the 70th minute of a 2–1 away defeat against Empoli. Two weeks later, on 31 March he played his first entire match for the club, a 1–0 home defeat against SPAL. Three days later, on 3 April, he scored his second goal in the 47th minute of a 3–2 home win over Parma. Valzania ended his season-long loan to Frosinone with 13 appearances, 2 goals and 1 assist, however Frosinone was relegated in Serie B.

Loans to Cremonese
On 31 August 2019, Valzania joined to Serie B side Cremonese on a season-long loan. On 15 September he made his debut for the club in a 4–1 away defeat against Pisa, he played the entire match.
On 5 September 2020, he returned on loan at Cremonese until 30 June 2021. On 16 July 2021, he returned to Cremonese on a third loan. Cremonese held an obligation to purchase his rights in case of promotion to Serie A.

Loan to SPAL 
On 31 August 2022, Valzania joined SPAL on loan until 30 June 2023.

International career 
On 10 October 2017 he made his debut with Italy U21 team as a substitute replacing Alessandro Murgia in the 82nd of a 4–0 home win over Marocco U-20 in an international friendly.

Career statistics

Club

References

External links

1996 births
People from Cesena
Footballers from Emilia-Romagna
Living people
Association football midfielders
Italian footballers
Italy under-21 international footballers
A.C. Cesena players
Atalanta B.C. players
A.S. Cittadella players
Delfino Pescara 1936 players
Frosinone Calcio players
U.S. Cremonese players
S.P.A.L. players
Serie A players
Serie B players
Sportspeople from the Province of Forlì-Cesena